Urukunnu Kurisumala (Mount Holy Cross Urukunnu) is a pilgrim center. "Kurisumala" literally means "Mount of the Cross".It is at an elevation of 1500 ft.  This holy place is situated in Urukunnu, close to Ottakkal Railway Station  in the Kollam district of the south Indian state of Kerala. 
It is a spiritual destination center for Christians. There is an ascent of 328 steps to reach on the top of the mountain. Devotees come here to venerate the Holy Cross.The passion and Death of Lord Jesus Christ on the Cross is commemorated here during the Lenten season, especially on Good Friday.  The 14 stations of the Way of the Cross have been clearly marked as one climbs the steps of the mountain. It is two and a half kilometers away from the Holy Cross Church. Every Good Friday, the Way of Cross procession begins from the Holy Cross Church, at 7 am and reaches at the top of the Holy Cross Mount.

References

Pilgrimage in India
Christianity in Kerala
Religion in Kollam district